Lanczos filtering and Lanczos resampling are two applications of a mathematical formula. It can be used as a low-pass filter or used to smoothly interpolate the value of a digital signal between its samples.  In the latter case, it maps each sample of the given signal to a translated and scaled copy of the Lanczos kernel, which is a sinc function windowed by the central lobe of a second, longer, sinc function.  The sum of these translated and scaled kernels is then evaluated at the desired points.

Lanczos resampling is typically used to increase the sampling rate of a digital signal, or to shift it by a fraction of the sampling interval.  It is often used also for multivariate interpolation, for example to resize or rotate a digital image.  It has been considered the "best compromise" among several simple filters for this purpose.

The filter is named after its inventor, Cornelius Lanczos.

Definition

Lanczos kernel

The effect of each input sample on the interpolated values is defined by the filter's reconstruction kernel , called the Lanczos kernel.

 

Equivalently,

The parameter  is a positive integer, typically 2 or 3, which determines the size of the kernel. The Lanczos kernel has   lobes: a positive one at the center, and  alternating negative and positive lobes on each side.

Interpolation formula 
 
The bounds of this sum are such that the kernel is zero outside of them.

Properties 
Therefore, the reconstructed signal  too will be continuous, with continuous derivative.

Therefore, the reconstructed signal exactly interpolates the given samples: we will have  for every integer argument .

The same reasoning applies in the case of truncated functions if we wish to remove Gibbs oscillations in their spectrum.

Multidimensional interpolation

Lanczos filter's kernel in two dimensions is

Evaluation

Advantages 

The theoretically optimal reconstruction filter for band-limited signals is the sinc filter, which has infinite support. The Lanczos filter is one of many practical (finitely supported) approximations of the sinc filter.  Each interpolated value is the weighted sum of  consecutive input samples.  Thus, by varying the  parameter one may trade computation speed for improved frequency response.  The parameter also allows one to choose between a smoother interpolation or a preservation of sharp transients in the data.  For image processing, the trade-off is between the reduction of aliasing artefacts and the preservation of sharp edges. Also as with any such processing, there are no results for the borders of the image. Increasing the length of the kernel increases the cropping of the edges of the image.

The Lanczos filter has been compared with other interpolation methods for discrete signals, particularly other windowed versions of the sinc filter.  Turkowski and Gabriel claimed that the Lanczos filter (with ) the "best compromise in terms of reduction of aliasing, sharpness, and minimal ringing", compared with truncated sinc and the Bartlett, cosine-, and Hann-windowed sinc, for decimation and interpolation of 2-dimensional image data. According to Jim Blinn, the Lanczos kernel (with ) "keeps low frequencies and rejects high frequencies better than any (achievable) filter we've seen so far."

Lanczos interpolation is a popular filter for "upscaling" videos in various media utilities, such as AviSynth and FFmpeg.

Limitations 
More generally, the range of values of the interpolated signal may be wider than the range spanned by the discrete sample values. In particular, there may be ringing artifacts just before and after abrupt changes in the sample values, which may lead to clipping artifacts. However, these effects are reduced compared to the (non-windowed) sinc filter. For a = 2 (a three-lobed kernel) the ringing is < 1%.

The method is one of the interpolation options available in the free software GNU Image Manipulation Program (GIMP). One way to visualize the ringing effect is to rescale a black and white block graphic and select Lanczos interpolation. 

When using the Lanczos filter for image resampling, the ringing effect will create light and dark halos along any strong edges.  While these bands may be visually annoying, they help increase the perceived sharpness, and therefore provide a form of edge enhancement.  This may improve the subjective quality of the image, given the special role of edge sharpness in vision.

In some applications, the low-end clipping artifacts can be ameliorated by transforming the data to a logarithmic domain prior to filtering.  In this case the interpolated values will be a weighted geometric mean, rather than an arithmetic mean, of the input samples.

The Lanczos kernel does not have the partition of unity property.  That is, the sum  of all integer-translated copies of the kernel is not always 1.  Therefore, the Lanczos interpolation of a discrete signal with constant samples does not yield a constant function.  This defect is most evident when .  Also, for  the interpolated signal has zero derivative at every integer argument. This is rather academic, since using a single-lobe kernel (a = 1) loses all the benefits of the Lanczos approach and provides a poor filter. There are many better single-lobe, bell-shaped windowing functions.

See also

Bicubic interpolation
Bilinear interpolation
Spline interpolation
Nearest-neighbor interpolation
Sinc filter

References

External links
 Anti-Grain Geometry examples: image_filters.cpp shows comparisons of repeatedly resampling an image with various kernels.
 imageresampler: A public domain image resampling class in C++ with support for several windowed Lanczos filter kernels.

Signal processing
Multivariate interpolation